USS L-3 (SS-42) was an L-class submarine of the United States Navy.

Description
The L-class boats designed by Electric Boat (L-1 to L-4 and L-9 to L-11) were built to slightly different specifications from the other L boats, which were designed by Lake Torpedo Boat, and are sometimes considered a separate class. They displaced  on the surface and  submerged. The L-class submarines had a crew of 28 officers and enlisted men.

For surface running, the Electric Boat submarines were powered by two  diesel engines, each driving one propeller shaft. When submerged each propeller was driven by a  electric motor. They could reach  on the surface and  underwater.

The boats were armed with four 18-inch (450 mm)  torpedo tubes in the bow. They carried four reloads, for a total of eight torpedoes. The Electric Boat submarines were initially not fitted with a deck gun; a single 3"/50 caliber gun on a disappearing mount was added during the war.

Construction and career
L-3s keel was laid down on 18 April 1914 by the Fore River Shipbuilding Company in Quincy, Massachusetts. She was launched on 15 March 1915 sponsored by Mrs. Lew Morton Atkins, and commissioned on 22 April 1916. Assigned to the Atlantic Submarine Flotilla, L-3 operated along the Atlantic coast from New England to Florida developing new techniques of undersea warfare, until April 1917.

 
Following the United States's entry into World War I, the submarine protected Allied shipping lanes to the European countries. Departing New London, Connecticut, on 27 November, L-3 sailed for the Azores via Bermuda arriving Ponta Delgada on 13 January 1918. One month later, she was dispatched to the British Isles for patrol duty out of Berehaven, Bantry Bay, Ireland, to protect Allied shipping losses from U-boat attacks.

Remaining in British waters throughout the war, L-3 departed the Isle of Portland, England, on 3 January 1919 for the United States, arriving Philadelphia, Pennsylvania, on 1 February. For the next two years, the submarine operated along the East Coast, performing experiments and developing submarine warfare tactics. L-3 was placed in commission, in ordinary, on 1 June 1921 at Philadelphia, and returned to full commission on 26 January 1922. After operations out of New London, Connecticut, for 14 months, the submarine arrived Norfolk, Virginia, on 21 April 1923.  L-3 decommissioned at Hampton Roads, Virginia, on 11 June 1923. She was scrapped, and her material was sold on 28 November 1933 in accordance with the London Naval Treaty.

Notes

References

External links
 

United States L-class submarines
World War I submarines of the United States
Ships built in Quincy, Massachusetts
1915 ships